Curry chicken noodle usually uses curry as soup base coupled with yellow noodles.

The dish contains chicken meat and tau pok. Curry plays an important part in this dish. Usually a more watery curry base is preferred so that the noodles are not hard to swallow.

East Asian curries
Japanese cuisine
Curry dishes